Sir Alexander Gordon Cardew  (14 March 1861 – 12 January 1937) was an Indian civil servant of British origin who served as the acting Governor of Madras from 29March 1919 to 10April 1919.

Early life
Alexander Cardew was born in Bath, Somerset on 14 March 1861 the eldest son of the Reverend J.W. Cardew. He was educated at the Somersetshire College and The Queen's College, Oxford and entered the Indian Civil Service in 1881.

India
Cardew served as an Under-Secretary in the Government of Madras from 1885 to 1890. Between 1892 and 1899 he was Inspector-General of Prison. He also served as a member of the Madras Legislative Council from 1906 to 1919 and in the Governor's Executive Council from 1914 to 1919.

As Governor of Madras
Cardew served as the Acting Governor of Madras from 29 March 1919 to 10 April 1919

Family life
Cardew married Evelyn Roberta Firth in 1886 and they had two sons and two daughters.

Alexander Evelyn Cardew. Born 19 Nov 1888. BA Balliol 1913. Married Broadway Parish Church 6 July 1920 Gertrude Evelyn Staniforth daughter of Rev. Staniforth.  
	
Margaret Isabel Cardew. Born March 1890. Married 9 Dec 1919 St James, Spanish Place, Captain Cuthbert Bellord RAF

Janet Cardew. Born September 1892.

Francis Mackay Cardew. Born 10 June 1904.

On 12 January 1937 he collapsed and died in the street in Kensington, London from a heart attack, aged 75.

Notes

1861 births
1937 deaths
Governors of Madras
Indian Civil Service (British India) officers
People from Bath, Somerset
Alumni of The Queen's College, Oxford
Knights Commander of the Order of the Star of India
Members of the Madras Legislative Council